The Roman Catholic Diocese of Crato is a diocese located in the city of Crato in the Ecclesiastical province of Fortaleza in Brazil.

History
 October 20, 1914: Established as Diocese of Crato from the Diocese of Ceará

Bishops
 Bishops of Crato (Roman rite), in reverse chronological order
 Bishop Magnus Henrique Lopes, O.F.M. Cap. (2022.01.12 – ...)
 Bishop Gilberto Pastana de Oliveira (2016.12.28 – 2021.06.02)
 Bishop Fernando Panico, M.S.C. (2001.05.02 – 2016.12.28)
 Bishop Newton Holanda Gurgel (1993.11.24 – 2001.05.02)
 Bishop Vicente de Paulo Araújo Matos (1961.01.28 – 1992.06.01)
 Bishop Francisco de Assis Pires (later Archbishop) (1931.08.11 – 1959.07.11)
 Bishop Quintino Rodrigo de Oliveira e Silva (1915.03.10 – 1929.12.29)

Coadjutor bishop
Gilberto Pastana de Oliveira (2016)

Auxiliary bishops
Vicente de Paulo Araújo Matos (1955-1961), appointed Bishop here
Newton Holanda Gurgel (1979-1993), appointed Bishop here

Other priests of this diocese who became bishops
Joaquim Ferreira de Melo, appointed Bishop of Pelotas, Rio Grande do Sul in 1921
Francisco Edimilson Neves Ferreira, appointed	Bishop of Tianguá, Ceara in 2017

References
 GCatholic.org
 Catholic Hierarchy

Roman Catholic dioceses in Brazil
Christian organizations established in 1914
Crato, Roman Catholic Diocese of
Roman Catholic dioceses and prelatures established in the 20th century